is the titular intergalactic superhero of a pulp-style tokusatsu science fiction space adventure television series titled .  Produced by Toei Company Ltd., the series aired on Tokyo Broadcasting System (TBS) from April 16 to September 24, 1967, with a total of 24 episodes.

This series is based very loosely on Captain Future, the pulp science fiction saga created by the influential Edmond Hamilton.  This was not the only time his work was adapted in Japan: Captain Future was officially adapted into an anime series by Toei Doga in 1978, and that same year, Tsuburaya Productions adapted his Starwolf novels into a tokusatsu sci-fi action series of the same title.

Originally, this series was aired by Tokyo Broadcasting System right after the end of the original Ultraman show to serve as a filler series while Tsuburaya Productions geared up for the production of Ultra Seven. So only 24 episodes of Captain Ultra were ordered by the network. So, the week following the conclusion of Captain Ultra, Ultra Seven premiered on TBS. Still, while short-lived, the series has been released in Japan on all of the major home video formats since the 1980s: VHS, LaserDisc, and DVD. In 2005, a tankōbon volume of the original serialized manga illustrated by Shunji Obata in Shogakukan's Weekly Shōnen Sunday in 1967 was published by Manga Shop.

Captain Ultra is among the more memorable tokusatsu series from the 1960s, and was one of the three cornerstones of Toei's programs of 1967, including Akakage and Giant Robo (better known in the US as Johnny Sokko and His Flying Robot). Some Japanese fans also compare the looks of Captain Ultra to that of Captain Scarlet, the title hero of Sylvia and Gerry Anderson's Supermarionation series, Captain Scarlet and the Mysterons (which had been shown in Japan around the same time and was very popular).

The series was aired in the Takeda Hour block (sponsored by the Takeda Pharmaceutical Company).

Characters

Captain Ultra (Hirohisa Nakata) - The hero.
Huck (Jiro Sagawa) - Captain Ultra's robot companion.
Joe (Nenji Kobayashi) - Captain Ultra's alien friend from Planet Kikero.
Akane (Yuki Jono) - Captain Ultra's beautiful space cadet.  Has assorted secret agent gadgets.
Kenji (Shigeru Yasunaka) - Captain Ultra's eager young boy space cadet.
Professor Munamoto (Ichiro Izawa) - The scientific expert for the heroes.

References

External links

1967 Japanese television series debuts
1967 Japanese television series endings
Tokusatsu television series
TBS Television (Japan) original programming
Toei tokusatsu